This is a list of finalists in the first UK series of So You Think You Can Dance. The live shows began airing January 9, 2010.

Charlie Bruce
Charlotte "Charlie" Bruce is a 19-year-old jazz dancer from Cropston. She attended Laine Theatre Arts stage school and is the youngest contestant this series. Bruce's first partner was hip-hop dancer Tommy Franzén. In week 3 she danced with contemporary dancer Robbie White, but in week 4 she danced with musical dancer Drew McOnie. In the semi finals she again danced with hip-hop dancer Tommy Franzén. She was named Britain's favourite dancer in the final.

Mark Calape
Mark Calape is a 24-year-old hip-hop dancer from Milton Keynes. He has no experience in styles other than hip-hop, but "nailed" the other styles in the Choreography Camp. He appeared in the music video "Down" by Jay Sean featuring Lil' Wayne. Calape is also the dancer, choreographer and leader of the dance crew Animaineax, which won the BBC3 series Move Like Michael Jackson. Calape's first partner was hip-hop dancer Lizzie Gough, but when he danced contemporary with jazz dancer Mandy Montanez in week 3, Calape got eliminated together with Hayley Newton.

Chloë Campbell
Chloë Campbell is a 25-year-old jazz dancer from Hanwell. Her partner was contemporary dancer Gavin Tsang, but in week 2 both were eliminated.

Tommy Franzén
Tommy Franzén is a 28-year-old hip-hop dancer from Sweden. He got his first major break aged 14 when he was cast in Joseph And His Amazing Technicolor Dreamcoat in Sweden. He then continued working for another 5 years within musical theatre and hip-hop dance shows in Sweden until 2000 when he moved to London to study at The Urdang Academy on a scholarship. He graduated 3 years later with a National Diploma in Performing Arts.
His first partner was jazz dancer Charlie Bruce. In week 3 he danced with salsa dancer Yanet Fuentes, and with contemporary jazz dancer Mandy Montanez in week 4. In week 4 he performed with jazz dancer Charlie Bruce. He ended up as the runner-up.

Yanet Fuentes
Yanet Fuentes is a 27-year-old salsa dancer from Cuba. She was the only contestant this series that represented something likely to the category ballroom. Her first partner was contemporary dancer Robbie White. In week 3 she danced with hip-hop dancer Tommy Franzén, but when she was paired with contemporary Robbie White again, she got eliminated together with Drew McOnie.

Lizzie Gough
Lizzie Gough is a 25-year-old hip-hop dancer from London. Having started at the age 4 with ballet, jazz and tap at her local school in Southampton, she then went on to train at Laine Theatre Arts. She still trains every day and when she's not dancing she's doing yoga to keep herself supple.
Her work includes various jobs from TV commercials to touring with Take That as one of their dancers.
Her first partner was hip-hop dancer Mark Calape. In week 3 she danced with contemporary dancer Drew McOnie, then with ballet dancer Alastair Postlethwaite in week 4 and contemporary dancer Robbie White in the semi-final. She finished in 3rd place.

Anabel Kutay
Anabel Kutay is a 26-year-old contemporary dancer from Manchester. She was the only female contestant that represents contemporary. She was paired with contemporary dancer Drew McOnie, but Kutay got eliminated in week 1 together with Chris Piper.

Drew McOnie
Drew McOnie is a 24-year-old Musical Theatre dancer from London. His first partner was contemporary dancer Anabel Kutay, but since she got eliminated in week 1, McOnie's new partner was broadway dancer Hayley Newton. They danced together in week 2, and in week 3, McOnie danced with hip-hop dancer Lizzie Gough. In week 4, he danced with jazz dancer Charlie Bruce, and got eliminated, together with Yanet Fuentes.

Before his departure the judges said he was one of the best dancers in the UK and they had been sure he would make the final. They were unanimous in not wanting him to leave, but he had stiff competition in contemporary technician, Robbie White.

Mandy Montanez
Mandy Montanez is a 30-year-old jazz dancer who grew up in Maryland USA. She has lived in London for the past eight years. The BBC press release shows her age as 31 but she was born in February 1979, making her 30 years old. She is the oldest contestant of the series. If she had auditioned in the US, she would have been ineligible for the top 20 due to her age. Montanez's first partner was ballet dancer Alastair Poslethwaite. In week 3 she danced with hip-hop dancer Mark Calape, and with hip-hop dancer Tommy Franzén. In week 5 she was eliminated after dancing with ballet dancer Alastair Postlethwaite again.

Hayley Newton
Hayley Newton is a 26-year-old Broadway-jazz dancer from Surrey. Her first partner were contemporary dancer Chris Piper, but since he got eliminated in week 1, Newton's new partner was contemporary dancer Drew McOnie. They danced together in week 2. In week 3, Newton got ballet dancer Alastair Poslethwaite, and she got eliminated together with Mark Calape.

Chris Piper
Chris Piper is a 26-year-old contemporary dancer from London. Show credits include the major successful 'Michael Flatley's Celtic Tiger Live' world tour. He was paired with broadway dancer Hayley Newton, but Piper got eliminated in week 1 together with Anabel Kutay.

Alastair Postlethwaite
Alastair Postlethwaite is a 28-year-old classical ballet dancer from Preston. He is the only ballet dancer of the series. At the age of 11 he was accepted into The Royal Ballet where he attended White Lodge in Richmond. He was assessed out after a year, but remains proud to have made it in at this early stage, as it proved wrong people who had doubted his ability as a dancer. He then went to on to train at Arts Ed School in Tring until he was 18.
After graduating, he joined Adventures in Motion Pictures where he performed in Matthew Bourne's Swan Lake on a European, UK and West End tour. He has also worked with the Scottish Ballet, Adonais, The Curve Foundation and The Royal Opera House. He travelled to Japan to work with K Ballet, created by Tetsuya Kumakawa. His Classical repertory includes Don Quixote, Nutcracker, The Prodigal Son, Coppélia, and Façade. Most recently, he finished in the UK tour of Cabaret with Wayne Sleep, which he appeared in for a year and a half. Postlethwaite's first partner was contemporary jazz dancer Mandy Montanez. In week 3 he danced with contemporary dancer Hayley Newton, and with hip-hop dancer Lizzie Gough in week 4. In week 5 he got eliminated after dancing with contemporary jazz dancer Mandy Montanez again.

Gavin Tsang
Gavin Tsang is a 23-year-old contemporary dancer from Shrewsbury. He likes to mix contemporary with other styles like jazz or hip-hop. Tsang's partner was jazz dancer Chloë Campbell, but in week 2, both of them got eliminated.

Robbie White
Robbie White is a 22-year-old contemporary dancer from Stockport. He attended Laine Theatre Arts stage school but has never been a professional dancer in the UK. White's first partner was salsa dancer Yanet Fuentes. In week 3 he danced with jazz dancer Charlie Bruce, and with salsa dancer Yanet Fuentes again in week 4. He danced with hip-hop dancer Lizzie Gough in the semi-final.
In the week leading up to the final, White dislocated his shoulder and therefore had to withdraw from the competition.

External  links
Information about the top 14

So You Think You Can Dance (British TV series)